Papiloa Foliaki (born 1935) is a Tongan former politician. She initially worked as a nurse, headed a nurses' union, and "led Tonga's first ever strike". She then went into business, as owner and operator of the Friendly Islander Hotel. In 1978, she was elected as a People's Representative to the Legislative Assembly of Tonga – the second woman ever (and first commoner woman) to sit in the Tongan Parliament, after Princess Si'uilikutapu (1975–78). Foliaki served until 1981. She co-founded the Tonga Leitis' Association, the only organisation in Tonga dedicated to LGBT rights.

References

Living people
Members of the Legislative Assembly of Tonga
Tongan women in politics
Tongan nurses
Tongan businesspeople
20th-century women politicians
1935 births
20th-century Tongan women
21st-century Tongan women 
20th-century Tongan people
21st-century Tongan people